{| class="infobox" style="width: 25em; text-align: left; font-size: 90%; vertical-align: middle;"
|+ <span style="font-size: 9pt">Accolades received by The Elephant Man</span>
|-
| colspan="3" style="text-align:center;" |
John Hurt at the 2011 Cannes Film Festival
|-
| colspan=3 |

|- style="background:#d9e8ff;"
| style="text-align:center;" colspan="3"|Total number of wins and nominations'|-
|
|
|
|-
|- style="background:#d9e8ff;"
| colspan="3" style="font-size: smaller; text-align:center;" | Footnotes
|}The Elephant Man is a 1980 American drama film based on the true story of Joseph Merrick (called John Merrick in the film), a severely deformed man in 19th century London. The film was directed by David Lynch and stars John Hurt, Anthony Hopkins, Anne Bancroft, John Gielgud, Wendy Hiller, Michael Elphick, Hannah Gordon, and Freddie Jones. Lynch adapted the screenplay draft by Christopher De Vore and Eric Bergren. Although Mel Brooks agreed to produce the film through his production company Brooksfilms, it was turned down by a number of studios before it was finally greenlit by Paramount Pictures.

Seen perhaps as the most conventional of Lynch's otherwise surrealist films, The Elephant Man'' was a commercial success, grossing over $26 million in the United States alone. The film was also a critical success, garnering universal acclaim and receiving multiple award nominations. Both Lynch and Hurt received nominations at the Academy Awards and British Academy Film Awards. The film went on to win the Best Film award at the latter, as well as Best Foreign Film at the César Awards.

The film's technical production was similarly lauded. John Morris' score was also nominated for several awards, including receiving a nod at the 24th Grammy Awards, but failed to win each time. The film's cinematography, by English cinematographer Freddie Francis, was likewise nominated for several awards, receiving one from the British Society of Cinematographers.  In addition, the film's editing, costume design, art direction and screenplay received nominations at the Academy Award and BAFTA ceremonies.

Awards and nominations

See also

List of accolades received by David Lynch

Footnotes

References

External links
 

Awards Elephant Man
Elephant Man, The